Eight referendums were held in Switzerland during 2002. The first two were held on 3 March on popular initiatives for Switzerland to join the United Nations and to reduce working hours. UN membership was approved, whilst the shorter working hours proposal was rejected. The next two were held on 2 June on amending the penal code regarding abortion, which was approved, and a popular initiative "for mother and child", which was rejected.

The next set referendums was held on 22 September, with a popular initiative on adding surplus gold reserves to the country's pension fund and a counter-proposal, as well as a federal law on the electricity market. All three were rejected. The final two referendums were held on 24 November on a popular initiative "against misuse of asylum rights" and a federal law on compulsory unemployment insurance and compensation for insolvencies. The asylum proposal was rejected, whilst the federal law was approved.

Results

 In the referendum with the counter-proposal voters could also give no answer. For the main question 53,237 voters (2.5%) did not answer, whilst for the counter-proposal 80,432 (3.8%) did not answer.

References

2002 elections in Switzerland
2002 referendums
2002
Abortion debate
Enlargement of the United Nations
Pension referendums
Switzerland and the United Nations
Abortion referendums